Leonid "Leo" Krupnik (born July 15, 1979 in Khmelnytskyi) is a Ukrainian-born American-Israeli former soccer player and current soccer coach.  He played college soccer at the University of California, Berkeley. He played soccer professionally for the Des Moines Menace, MetroStars, Wilmington Hammerheads, Charleston Battery, Maccabi Netanya, Maccabi Herzliya, Bnei Sakhnin, Maccabi Haifa, New York Red Bulls, Maccabi Netanya, Hapoel Petah Tikva, Maccabi Umm al-Fahm, Maccabi Kabilio Jaffa, and Sektzia Nes Tziona. He won a silver medal at the 2005 Maccabiah Games in Israel with Team USA.

Career

Youth and college
Krupnik was born in Ukraine, and is Jewish. He moved with his parents, Mark and Rita, and brother Vladimir, from his native Khmelnytskyi, Ukraine, to the United States in the 1990s, settling in San Francisco, California. Initially a promising gymnast, Krupnik was spotted playing football with some friends by the manager of the San Francisco Vikings youth team, and the youngster quickly changed sports. Krupnik attended and was the team soccer captain of George Washington High School, graduating in 1997.

He played four years of college soccer at the University of California, Berkeley ('01), majoring in social welfare. Krupnik was All-Pac-10 honorable mention in 2000 and 2001, Pac-10 All-Academic honorable mention in 2000 and first team in 2001.  Krupnik was also strong academically, and was on the Dean's Honor List in Fall of 2000.

Professional
Krupnik was drafted with the 69th pick of the 2002 MLS SuperDraft by the MetroStars, but did not make the squad, and instead spent the 2002 season with the Des Moines Menace of the Premier Development League. He was signed by the MetroStars late in the season, again without seeing any first-team action, and was then released on free transfer to the Wilmington Hammerheads. After winning the 2003 championship with Wilmington, Krupnik was signed by Charleston Battery.

During his time in Israel in 2005 with the US Maccabiah Games team, Krupnik caught the eye of a scout from Maccabi Netanya. Manager Reuven Atar asked Krupnik if he could join the team for training but Krupnik had a contract in the US. It was his sister, Svetlana, who kept in touch with Reuven Atar and immediately after finishing his contract, Krupnik immigrated to Israel. Krupnik was attractive to Israeli club teams because he was eligible to receive Israeli citizenship and not count as a foreigner.

During the 2005–06 season he got into a contract dispute with the management. After the conclusion of the season, ownership of the club changed hands, and the Israeli manager, Reuven Atar, who brought Krupnik to the club, was fired. Krupnik was expected to return to the United States. Talks ensued between him and Major League Soccer but nothing became final.

On July 20, 2006 Reuven Atar was appointed as manager of newly promoted Israeli Premier League club, Maccabi Herzliya. His first action was to sign Krupnik to a contract with the club. Krupnik stayed with the club until the winter recess when he decided not to continue after Maccabi Herzliya would not agree to a new contract.

After leaving Maccabi Herzliya, Krupnik joined Bnei Sakhnin for the second half of the 2006–07 season and helped the club gain promotion to the Israeli Premier League. The following season Krupnik helped the newly promoted side to a fourth-place finish and qualification to the Intertoto Cup.

On June 17, 2008, Krupnik signed a contract with Maccabi Haifa for 3 years worth $360,000. During his first season with the club Krupnik was a fixture in central defense appearing in 30 league matches, and helped Maccabi Haifa clinch their 11th Israeli Premier League title.

Krupnik returned the New York Red Bulls, known as the MetroStars during his first stint with the club, in July 2009. Krupnik made his MLS debut in a 4–0 loss to Colorado Rapids on July 25, 2009, and played in three games for the team before returning to Israel in November, when he was signed for a second stint with Maccabi Netanya.

Since 2015 Krupnik has been the soccer coach at Menlo-Atherton High School in California.

International
In 2005, coach Lev Kirshner picked Krupnik for the United States squad for the 2005 Maccabiah Games, an international Jewish athletic event similar to the Olympics held in Israel every four years. Kirshner brought a talented squad with the most professional experience ever. The American team, which also had Jonathan Bornstein and Benny Feilhaber playing for it, reached the final but lost to the host Israeli team, which was composed of Israel's Under-21 national team players.

Statistics

Honours
 Israeli Premier League (1):
 2008–09

References

External links
 
 Maccabi Haifa profile
 University of California profile

1979 births
Living people
American expatriate soccer players
American expatriate sportspeople in Israel
American people of Ukrainian-Jewish descent
American soccer players
Association football defenders
Ukrainian Jews
Sportspeople from Khmelnytskyi, Ukraine
American soccer coaches
Soccer players from San Francisco
Ukrainian emigrants to the United States
Ukrainian expatriate footballers
Ukrainian expatriate sportspeople in the United States
Jewish footballers
Jewish American sportspeople
Jewish Ukrainian sportspeople
California Golden Bears men's soccer players
Des Moines Menace players
Ukrainian footballers
USL League Two players
Wilmington Hammerheads FC players
USL Second Division players
Charleston Battery players
USL First Division players
Israeli Premier League players
Liga Leumit players
Maccabiah Games medalists in football
Maccabiah Games silver medalists for the United States
Competitors at the 2005 Maccabiah Games
New York Red Bulls players
Maccabi Jaffa F.C. players
Maccabi Umm al-Fahm F.C. players
Hapoel Petah Tikva F.C. players
Maccabi Netanya F.C. players
Maccabi Herzliya F.C. players
Bnei Sakhnin F.C. players
Maccabi Haifa F.C. players
Major League Soccer players
New York Red Bulls draft picks